The London Borough of Enfield is the northernmost of the Outer London boroughs. The borough lies within the Metropolitan Green Belt, and several of its 123 or more parks and open spaces  are part of it. The ancient Enfield Chase, remnants of which still exist, occupied much of the area. In addition to many playgrounds and sports facilities (including a number of golf courses), the main areas of public open space are:

 Albany Park: Enfield Wash,  formally opened 1902, since extended; west of Enfield Lock railway station
 Arnos Park, Arnos Grove:  opened in 1928; north of Arnos Grove tube station; Pymmes Brook Trail passes through it 
 Beech Hill Park, Hadley Wood: includes Hadley Wood Golf Course
 Broomfield Park, Palmers Green: , purchased 1903
 Bullsmoor Playing Fields, Freezywater
 Bury Lodge Gardens Edmonton
 Bush Hill Park Recreation Ground Bush Hill Park was officially opened on 18 April 1911
 Churchfields Recreation Ground Edmonton
 Craig Park, Edmonton
 Cunningham Park, Freezywater
  Ryans Park, Enfield Highway
 Durants Park, Enfield Highway created in 1903.
 Forty Hall Park: an estate of  managed by Enfield Borough, includes woodlands and grounds around Forty Hall
 Firs Farm, (Firs Lane Winchmore Hill London N21 2PJ)'
 Grovelands Park, Southgate
 Hilly Fields, near Gordon Hill railway station:  purchased 1911
 Hollywood Gardens, Edmonton
 Jubilee Park, Lower Edmonton
 King George's Field, Enfield Highway, opened in 1939, to commemorate the Silver Jubilee of King George V and Queen Mary in 1935.
Minchenden Oak Garden, Southgate
 Montagu Road Recreation Ground, Edmonton
 Oakwood Park:  purchased 1927
 Ponders End Recreation Ground ( Ryans Park), Ponders End
 Plevna Road Open Space, Edmonton
 Pymmes Park, Edmonton:  purchased 1899
 Tatem Park, Edmonton
 Town Park, Enfield Town, which incorporates the last public remnant of Enfield Old Park.
 Trent Park: country park
 Whitewebbs Park

Apart from those open spaces, there are the two large reservoirs. The King George V and the William Girling collectively known as the Chingford Reservoirs situated alongside the River Lea in the east of the Borough.

Covert Way is Enfield's only Local Nature Reserve.

References

External links
 Enfield parks and open spaces
 Enfield's "palaces, parks and open spaces"